(born August 25, 1985 in Kyoto) is a Japanese softball player who won the gold medal at the 2008 Summer Olympics.

References

External links
 
 

1985 births
Japanese softball players
Living people
Olympic softball players of Japan
Olympic gold medalists for Japan
Softball players at the 2008 Summer Olympics
Olympic medalists in softball
Medalists at the 2008 Summer Olympics
21st-century Japanese women